Kentucky Route 402 (KY 402) is a  state highway in the U.S. state of Kentucky. The highway connects mostly rural areas of Marshall County with Hardin.

Route description
KY 402 begins at an intersection with KY 58 (Brewers Highway / Mayfield Highway) northwest of Brewers, within the southwestern part of Marshall County. It travels to the southeast and travels through Brewers, where it intersects the northern terminus of KY 1836 (Duncan Creek Road). The highway curves to the east-southeast and intersects the southern terminus of KY 1522 (Soldier Creek Road). It curves to the east-northeast and intersects the northern terminus of KY 299 (Kirksey Highway) and then the southern terminus of KY 2606 (Jackson School Road) in rapid succession. It begins heading in a due east direction and intersects the southern terminus of KY 1311 (Slickback Road). KY 402 crosses over the South Fork Soldier Creek and intersects the southern terminus of KY 1949 (Wadesboro Road South). It crosses over Martins Creek and enters Hardin. It curves to the east-northeast and intersects U.S. Route 641 (US 641). The highway passes Pace Cemetery and intersects KY 1824 (Murray Highway). It has a second crossing of Martins Creek and intersects the northern terminus of KY 905 (Commerce Street). It crosses over Clarks River and curves to the southeast. After intersecting the southern terminus of KY 962 (Old Olive Road), it curves to the east-northeast. It intersects the southern terminus of KY 1364 (Olive Creek Road). It crosses over Jonathan Creek. The highway crosses over Clear Creek and heads to the east-northeast. A short distance later, it meets its eastern terminus, an intersection with US 68.

History
Between August 1985 and February 1990, KY 402 was a designation of the Bert T. Combs Mountain Parkway, which is now designated in one section as KY 9000 and in another section as KY 9009. Until November 1982, KY 402 was a designation of the road from Flemingsburg to Beechburg; this is now part of KY 3301.

Major intersections

See also

References

0402
Kentucky Route 80
Transportation in Marshall County, Kentucky